Colorado State Highway 70 may refer to:

Interstate 70 in Colorado, the only Colorado highway numbered 70 since 1968
Colorado State Highway 70 (1923–1968) south and east of Denver, now SH 30